Mesilau, named after Mesilau River, is an area situated at approximately  above sea level on the East Ridge of Mount Kinabalu in Kinabalu National Park, Sabah, Malaysian Borneo. It is the site of the Mesilau Nature Resort, which is owned and operated by Sutera Sanctuary Lodges.

Mesilau East River and Mesilau West River pass through the Mesilau area. Mesilau East River forms a deep ravine, and Mesilau Cave is located nearby.

One of the two main summit routes of Mount Kinabalu starts at the Mesilau Nature Resort and is called the Mesilau Trail.

Flora
Mesilau is home to the only population of Nepenthes rajah pitcher plants accessible to regular visitors. The plants grow on a steep hillside overlooking Mesilau East River. A number of other species, including N. burbidgeae, N. fusca, and N. macrovulgaris, have been transplanted there from the area around the Mesilau Nature Resort on Pinosok Plateau. A single example of the rare natural hybrid N. lowii × N. rajah also grows nearby. Daily guided tours are organised to the "Nepenthes Garden" where these plants are found. This nature trail is subject to a fee and operates daily from 9 am to 4 pm.

Climate
Mesilau has a subtropical highland climate (Cfb) with heavy rainfall year-round.

References

External links
 Sabah Parks Directory: Mesilau
 Kinabalu Park - Guide to Mesilau Summit Trail
 Mount Kinabalu Information Travel Guide: Mesilau
 Kundasang & Mesilau
 The Sabah Society Mesilau Trip, 26–27 March 2011

Mount Kinabalu
Protected areas of Sabah